Phymosia is a genus of flowering plants in the family Malvaceae.

Species include:
Phymosia abutiloides (L.) Desv. ex Ham.
Phymosia anomala Fryxell
Phymosia crenulata (Brandegee) Fryxell
Phymosia floribunda (Schltdl.) Fryxell
Phymosia pauciflora (Baker f.) Fryxell
Phymosia rosea (DC.) Kearney, native to El Salvador, Guatemala and Mexico
Phymosia rzedowskii Fryxell
Phymosia umbellata (Cav.) Kearney, native to Mexico

References

Malveae
Malvaceae genera